Jamil Fakhri (15 September 1946 – 9 June 2011) was a veteran Pakistani film, TV and stage artist. He gained popularity from Pakistan Television Corporation's TV drama serial Andhera Ujala, in which he played the police inspector Jaffer Hussain. In TV drama Andhera Ujala, a high-ranking police officer Qavi Khan and his team of low and middle rank members of police fight crime in their locality in very humorous situations.

Early life and career
Jamil Fakhri was born in Lahore, Pakistan in 1946. After finishing his basic education, he started working for National Bank of Pakistan. Then he started doing theater at WAPDA Auditorium and Alhamra Arts Council, and started working with some already established TV actors and directors. Jamil Fakhri worked with many prominent TV actors of the time including Irfan Khoosat, Khayyam Sarhadi, Firdous Jamal, Masood Akhtar, Kamal Ahmed Rizvi, and Nanha. He also worked with some top TV producers and directors in the 1980s including Yawar Hayat Khan, Rashid Dar (director of the above-mentioned TV drama Andhera Ujala), Kamal Ahmed Rizvi and many more. Besides acting in television dramas, he also acted in more than 50 Pakistani films.

TV dramas
 Tanay Banay (TV Drama)
 Waris (1979)
 Alif Noon (1981–1982)
 Andhera Ujala (1984–1985)
 Ureek
 Aaj Ka Khel
 Alif Laila
 Jheel
 Zakhira Andozi
 Ek Muhabbat Sau Afsanay

Awards and recognition
 Pride of Performance Award by the President of Pakistan in 2002.
 Nigar Award- Best Comedian award in film Yeh Zamana Aur Hai (1981).

Death and legacy
According to Jamil Fakhri's family, he first learned on 7 December 2010 that his son, Ali Ayaz Fakhri, had been kidnapped and later killed in the U.S. where he was living. Details about his son's gruesome murder reportedly were that he was cut up into pieces and then set on fire. This really distressed the actor and took a heavy toll on his health for several months until finally he had a stroke on 31 May 2011 and was taken to a hospital. He stayed in a coma there for many days and then died on 9 June 2011 at Lahore, Pakistan. 

He left behind three other sons, and a widow. Farrukh Bashir, General Manager of Pakistan Television, Lahore Center, expressed his feelings on his death by saying that Jamil Fakhri had remained associated with PTV for a long time and was very loyal to it. With his death, PTV had also lost a great artist. He was buried in Miani Sahib Graveyard, Lahore  near the Shrine of Ilm-ud-Shaheed.

References

1946 births
2011 deaths
Male actors from Lahore
Pakistani male television actors
Pakistani male film actors
Pakistani male stage actors
Nigar Award winners
Recipients of the Pride of Performance